Arita may refer to:

Arita (surname)
Arita, Saga, a town in Saga Prefecture, Japan
Arita ware, a kind of Japanese porcelain made in the area around the town
Arita (skipper), a synonym for a genus of skipper butterflies 
Arita, a brand name from Ritek
Arita, a red berry mentioned in the novel The Blue Lagoon